WOH G17 is a possible red supergiant (RSG) located in the Large Magellanic Cloud (LMC) or a Mira variable asymptotic giant branch (AGB) star in the constellation of Mensa.  The star is often considered to be a foreground object; much closer than the LMC, probably in the Milky Way, and therefore is potentially much smaller and less luminous.

This would correspond to a volume 25.8 billion times bigger than the Sun. If placed at the center of the Solar system its photosphere would engulf the orbit of Saturn and reach to about 3/4 the distance to Uranus’s orbit.

See also 
 WOH G64
 Stephenson 2 DFK 1

References 

Mensa (constellation)
M-type supergiants
Extragalactic stars
Large Magellanic Cloud
J04392369-7311028
IRAS catalogue objects
Asymptotic-giant-branch stars
Mira variables
TIC objects